Mathraki is an island and a former community of the Ionian Islands, Greece. It is one of the Diapontian Islands. Since the 2019 local government reform it is part of the municipality of Central Corfu and Diapontian Islands, of which it is a municipal unit. The municipal unit has an area of 3.532 km2. Population 329 (2011). Mathraki is a 45-minute boat ride off the coast of Corfu (4 NM from Cape Arilas). It has three restaurants that double as general stores, villas and "rooms to let". Mathraki is a quiet island that manages to stay clear of tourists except for the occasional hikers that brave the rocky coastline. The municipal unit includes the three nearby islets Diakopo, Diaplo and Tracheia.

History
Mathraki was inhabited since the 16th century by settlers from the nearby islands of Paxoi and Othonoi. The origin of its name is unknown, but according to a popular tradition, derives from anthrakia, because in the past the island had been burnt. It became part of Greece in 1864, when the Ionian islands were ceded to Greece by the British. Today it is a serene and tranquil place for holidays. In 2021 the only elementary school of the island re-opened after 21 years with only one student.

Historical population

References

External links
Official site from Local Authority Official site from Mathraki Local Authority (Languages Greek-English-Italian
Official site from Prefecture of Corfu Official site from Prefecture of Corfu (multi language)
Website for Mathraki Island www.mathraki.net 

Populated places in Corfu (regional unit)
Ports and harbours of Greece
Islands of Greece
Islands of the Ionian Islands (region)
Landforms of Corfu (regional unit)